Record News (formerly known as Rede Mulher) is the first 24-hour free-to-air terrestrial news channel in Brazil, and the third Brazilian news channel to be launched after GloboNews and BandNews TV. It is owned by RecordTV.

History 
In 1953, TV Record started as the second Brazilian TV channel (the first was the extinct Rede Tupi). As the network celebrated its 54th anniversary, a new channel has been launched. This is the first Brazilian free-to-air and terrestrial news channel. The on air button was pushed at 8:15pm (Brasília time) by the then president Luiz Inácio Lula da Silva and Edir Macedo, the network's owner.

Through the Record Europa subsidiary, Record News is widely available across digital platforms in Portugal. It is mostly a simulcast of Record News in Brazil, with some local content.

Programming 

Reality shows/Game shows

 Car Motor Show
 Duelo de Salões
 X Smile Brasil

Controversy
Two days prior to the launch of Record News, the Vice-President of Organizações Globo, Evandro Guimarães, went to Brasilia to meet government officials, including the Communications Minister, Hélio Costa, accusing Rede Record of owning two television networks, Rede Record and Record News, inside the city of São Paulo. In Brazilian Law, it is illegal to own more than one television station in a city.

When Guimarāes trip to Brasilia was revealed in a blog owned by the newspaper Folha de S. Paulo, Rede Record attacked Rede Globo in an editorial in its national news broadcast, Jornal da Record, accusing Rede Globo of trying to rescue its monopoly on the media and news, and also claiming that Rede Globo was afraid of Record News because Rede Globo, which owns its own news channel Globo News, which is only a payable cable channel, would lose advertising revenue from Globo News to Record News. Rede Record also said that Record News was located outside the city of São Paulo, so Record News was broadcasting legitimately. Rede Record also mentioned Rede Globo's past dealings which could be considered illegal and a crime in Brazilian law, and Rede Globo's relationship with Brazil's military dictatorship. Rede Globo also claimed it was representing another television rival, Rede Bandeirantes, but Rede Record responded that Rede Bandeirantes owns two channels in Sāo Paulo.

Rede Globo responded to Rede Record's attack by saying it had no merits, it had no proof that Rede Globo had done anything illegal in the past, and Rede Record was just jealous of Rede Globo's high ratings.

Slogans 
 2007–2014: Jornalismo 24 horas de plantão (Journalism 24 hours on call)
 2014–2016: A líder em notícias (The leader in news)
 2016–2022: Informação para você crescer (Information for you to grow)
 2022–present: Informação é tudo (Information is everything)

References

External links 

Television networks in Brazil
Portuguese-language television stations in Brazil
Television channels and stations established in 2007
24-hour television news channels in Brazil
2007 establishments in Brazil
Grupo Record
Mass media in São Paulo